The rock-catfish, Austroglanis sclateri, is a species of catfish in the family Austroglanididae. This freshwater fish is endemic to the Vaal River in South Africa. It is also found in Lesotho and Namibia.

Distribution 
Africa:Endemic to the Orange-Vaal system, South Africa. Also found in Lesotho and Namibia.

Size 
Length: 300mm Weight: +-1KG

Behavior 
Occurs in rocky habitats in flowing water, favoring rapids. Feeds on invertebrates, especially insects, taken from rock surfaces; larger specimens also take small fish. Rarely caught by anglers

References

 Annals of the South African Museum = Annale van die Suid-Afrikaanse Museum (1898)
 Fishbase: Austroglanis sclateri 
 Skelton, P.H., 1993. A complete guide to the freshwater fishes of southern Africa. Southern Book Publishers. 388 p.

Austroglanis
Freshwater fish of South Africa
Fish described in 1901
Taxonomy articles created by Polbot